Sudokuro is a puzzle game for the Nintendo DS created by American studio FRONTLINE Studios Inc. and published by Crave Entertainment. It features two puzzle games: Sudoku and Kakuro. Each game features three levels of difficulty. Answers can be entered by writing them with the stylus or using buttons.

Gameplay
Sudoku features an unlimited number of automatically generated puzzles, plus 1,500 built-in puzzles. A Simple mode for children features puzzles on a two-by-two grid. Kakuro provides more than 5,000 puzzles.

Critical reception
The game was reviewed and given a score of 2.0 out of 10 on IGN.

References

External links
 GameSpot Page

2007 video games
Crave Entertainment games
Frontline Studios games
Nintendo DS games
Nintendo DS-only games
Puzzle video games
Single-player video games
Video games developed in the United States